Junk Yard is a pinball game released by Williams Electronics in 1996. The game was advertised with the slogan "The meanest game in the whole darn town.".

Description
The playfield of Junk Yard contains different toys e.g. a crane with a wrecking ball - a pinball hanging from a chain, a toilet that flushes the ball and a doghouse with an attack dog.

The player assumes the role of an inventor who is locked inside a junkyard after it has closed for the night and must find a way to escape. The goal is to collect pieces of junk and build various machines (shown on the blueprint in the center of the playfield), each of which enables a mode or mini-game when completed. Once all the modes have been played, the player can start one more mode involving a battle against the junkyard owner in outer space. A devil and angel give tips to the player on what to do. Slingshots are lit by controlled lights, so either the angel or devil can be lit. The game also contains modes featured in previous Williams pinball titles, such as the video mode from Attack from Mars.

The game uses an instrumental version of the song "Money (That's What I Want)" as its primary background music.

Game quotes
 "Radar ah.... assembled"
 "Time for a swim!"
 "Anybody − heh, heh − got a light?"
 "I'm Crazy Bob and you're trapped in my junkyard!"

Cast of Characters
 Devil
 Angel
 Crazy Bob

Digital versions
Junk Yard was available as a licensed table in The Pinball Arcade up to June 29, 2018. WMS license expired on June 30, 2018. However, Zen Studios announced on September 4, 2018 that they have acquired licensing for Williams/Bally machines and is include this game as part of a beta on Steam for Pinball FX 3 and was later released on October 9, 2018.

References

External links
IPDB listing for Junk Yard

Williams pinball machines
1996 pinball machines